Robert Leckie may refer to:
Robert Leckie (RCAF officer) (1890–1975), Canadian air marshal
Robert Leckie (author) (1920–2001), American author of military history
Robert Leckie (footballer) (1846–1887), Scottish footballer
Robert Gilmour Leckie (1833–1914), Canadian mining engineer